Quincy Hoeve (born 3 April 2003) is a Bonaire footballer who currently plays for FC Volendam and the Bonaire national team. Hoeve previously played for the youth teams of Sparta Rotterdam and Gil Vicente F.C.

Club career

Youth
While playing for SV Atlétiko Tera Corá of the Bonaire League, Hoeve was scouted by Sparta Rotterdam and signed for the Dutch club's academy in April 2019.

In summer 2019 Hoeve traveled with Sparta Rotterdam's senior squad for a 2019–20 KNVB Cup match, but did not see action. His first goal for the club came on 27 September 2019 in a 3–1 victory over the under-17 team of powerhouse AFC Ajax. Two weeks later he scored again, this time in a victory against SBV Vitesse U17. Hoeve had scored in three straight matches following a two-goal friendly performance against Almere City FC later that month. In December of that year, the player scored a brace against FC Groningen U19 which helped qualify Sparta Rotterdam for the Championship Group for the second half of the season. Hoeve began 2020 similar to 2019 with a goal against Ajax in a 3–3 friendly draw. He went on to score a brace against the academy of FC Utrecht in March 2020.

In May 2021 Hoeve went on trial with Eredivisie clubs Go Ahead Eagles and FC Den Bosch. However, following two successful seasons in the Netherlands, he joined Gil Vicente F.C. of Portugal's Primeira Liga in September 2021. He continued his scoring form with the club, including a strike against F.C. Paços de Ferreira under-19 in December 2021.

In late August 2022 Hoeve returned to the Netherlands and joined the youth team of Volendam of the Eredivisie after a short training period. Shortly thereafter he made his league debut for the club against Koninklijke HFC, scoring the only goal in the 1–0 victory.

International career
Hoeve received his first senior international call-up in November 2018 at the age of fifteen for 2019–20 CONCACAF Nations League qualifying matches against the Dominican Republic and Jamaica. However, he did not go on to appear in either match. He received his next call-up for 2022–23 CONCACAF Nations League C matches against Turks and Caicos, Sint Maarten, and the United States Virgin Islands in June 2022.

He made his debut on 3 June 2022 in Bonaire's opening match against the Turks and Caicos Islands. He started and played seventy five minutes of the eventual 4–1 victory. Three days later he scored his first international goal in a 2–2 draw with Sint Maarten in the second match of the tournament.

International goals
Scores and results list Bonaire's goal tally first.

International career statistics

References

External links

WDB Sport profile

Bonaire footballers
Bonaire international footballers
Association football forwards
2003 births
Living people